Kawardha is one of the 90 Legislative Assembly constituencies of Chhattisgarh state in India. It is in Kabirdham district and is a segment of Rajnandgaon Lok Sabha seat. The seat used to be part of Madhya Pradesh Legislative Assembly when Chhattisgarh was part of MP.

Members of Assembly

Madhya Pradesh Assembly, until 2000
 1962 : Vishwaraj Singh (RRP)
 1993 : Raman Singh (BJP)
 1998 : Yogeshwar Raj Singh (INC)

Chhattisgarh Assembly, since 2000 
 2003 : Yogeshwar Raj Singh (INC)
 2013 : Ashok Sahu (BJP)

Election results

1962 Assembly Election
 Vishwaraj Singh (RRP) : 16,660 votes  
 Shyamprasad Awasthi (INC) : 6,536

1998 Assembly Election
 Yogeshwar Raj Singh (INC) : 52,950 votes  
 Dr. Raman Singh (BJP) : 37,524

2003 Assembly Election
 Yogeshwar Raj Singh (INC) : 51,092 votes  
 Dr. Siyaram Sahu (BJP) : 46,904

2013 Assembly Election
 Ashok Sahu (BJP) : 93,645 votes  
 Akbar Bhai (INC) : 91,087

2018

See also
Kabirdham district
 List of constituencies of Chhattisgarh Legislative Assembly

References 

Kabirdham district
Assembly constituencies of Chhattisgarh